Monacolin J is a statin made by red yeast rice. Monacolin J is a precursor to simvastatin and has potential neuroprotective activities.

It can be produced by total mycosynthesis.

References

Statins